Giovanni Maddalena is full professor of theoretical philosophy at the University of Molise, Italy. He works on American philosophy, especially focusing on Charles Sanders Peirce and classic pragmatists.

Career
He proposes a new paradigm of reasoning in The Philosophy of  Gesture (Montreal, McGill-Queen’s 2015). According to this philosophy a gesture "any performed act with a beginning and an end that carries on a meaning (from the Latin gero=to bear, to carry on)".

He is Senior Fellow of the Institute of American Thought (IUPUI, Indianapolis) and Member of the scientific board of the Philosophy Department at École normale supérieure (Paris). Maddalena has been Fulbright Research Scholar (2010), Professeur Invité at École Normale Supérieure (2015), invited professor at University of Sao Paulo (Brasil), Santa Fe (Argentina),

He is founder and executive editor of the European Journal of Pragmatism and American Philosophy, founder and president of the Associazione Pragma, founder and co-director of the Vasily Grossman Study Center.He directs the series Biblioteca del Leonardo at Editore Carabba and collaborates with the newspapers Il Foglio, Tempi, Zafferano.news.

Bibliography 
2021– Filosofia del gesto. Un nuovo uso per pratiche antiche. Roma: Carocci.
2021– (ed.) The Italian Pragmatists. Between Allies and Enemies. Edited by Maddalena G – Tuzet G., Brill-Rodopi, The Netherlands.
2020– (with Guido Gili). The History and Theory of Post-Truth Communication. London: Palgrave-MacMillan.
2018 – (ed.) Vasily Grossman. A Writer’s Freedom. Edited by Bonola A.-Maddalena G., McGill-Queen’s University Press, Montreal.
2015 – The Philosophy of Gesture, Montreal: McGill-Queen’s University Press.
2015– (ed.) Il pragmatismo. Dalle origini agli sviluppi contemporanei, a cura di R.M Calcaterra, G. Maddalena, G. Marchetti, Carocci, Roma.
2009– Metafisica per assurdo. Peirce e i problemi dell’epistemologia contemporanea, Rubbettino, Soveria Mannelli (CZ).
2005– (editor and translator) C.S. Peirce, Scritti scelti, collana I Classici, UTET, Torino.
2003– Istinto razionale. Studi sulla semiotica dell’ultimo Peirce, Trauben Editore, Torino.
2000– La lotta delle tradizioni, MacIntyre e la filosofia in America, L’Arciere (Cuneo).

References 

Year of birth missing (living people)
Living people